Hatch Plain is a small debris-covered area at about , on the eastern margin of the Du Toit Nunataks, in the Read Mountains of the Shackleton Range, Antarctica. It was photographed from the air by the U.S. Navy in 1967, and surveyed by the British Antarctic Survey, 1968–71. In association with the names of geologists grouped in this area, it was named by the UK Antarctic Place-Names Committee in 1971 after Frederick H. Hatch (1864–1932), a British consulting geologist, and the author of standard textbooks on igneous and sedimentary petrology.

References

Plains of Antarctica
Landforms of Coats Land